Jinyuan District is one of six districts of the prefecture-level city of Taiyuan, the capital of Shanxi Province, North China.

See also 

 Jinci, famous temple complex located in the district

References

External links
www.xzqh.org 

County-level divisions of Shanxi